This is a list of media based on work by Astrid Lindgren.

Live action film

Films based on Lindgren's works

Films about Astrid Lindgren

Documentaries about Astrid Lindgren

Documentaries about works by Astrid Lindgren

Interviews with Astrid Lindgren

Narrative films

Animation film

Television series

See also 
 Astrid Lindgren bibliography
 Astrid Lindgren’s plays

References

External links

 
Lists of television series based on works
Lists of films based on works